Burykino is a rural locality (a village) in Rozhdestvenskoye Rural Settlement, Sobinsky District, Vladimir Oblast, Russia. The population was 8 as of 2010. There are 2 streets.

Geography 
Burykino is located 6 km east from Rozhdestveno, 40 km north of Sobinka (the district's administrative centre) by road. Taratinka is the nearest rural locality.

References 

Rural localities in Sobinsky District